Provincial highways in Ontario include all roads maintained by the Ministry of Transportation as part of the Ontario Provincial Highway Network.



King's Highway 
Although all roads in the provincial highway network are legally part of the King's Highway,
the term is primarily associated with the highways numbered 2 through 148, the 400-series highways and the Queen Elizabeth Way.

400-series highways

Secondary highways

Tertiary roads

7000-series highways 
The following is a list of the unsigned 7000-series highways as of October 2020. This list is compiled using the official MTO Provincial Highway Network and MTO Jurisdiction datasets.

See also

References

External links 
Ministry of Transportation
Ontario 511 Traveller Information
MTO Provincial Highway Network

Ontario Highways - The History of the King's Highways and other Ontario Provincial Highways
Ontario Highways - asphaltplanet.ca

 List
Provincial Highways